WTXY (1540 AM) is a daytime-only radio station broadcasting a classic hits music format, with local news, sports and community information. Licensed to Whiteville, North Carolina, United States, the station, along with translator W280FO (103.9 FM), is owned by Jeffrey Allen Jones and Glasgow Hicks III, through licensee Audiotraxx Media Partners LLC.

History
WTXY's first license was granted to original owner Greg Singletary (Waccamaw Broadcasting Co.) on November 17, 1978 with the call letters WOOZ. The station changed its call letters on December 31, 1979 to WTXY. The radio station was sold to Tom Stanley (Stanley Broadcasting, Inc.) in 1980, who served the community until he sold it to Jeff Millikin (Millikin Broadcasting) on March 14, 2007.  The station was immediately put up for sale and purchased by Rob Kendall and Jason Dozier (WTXY Radio, LLC) on August 6, 2008. The station was granted the license to begin simulcasting on the 250-watt 103.9FM W280FO on July 16, 2018. Audiotraxx Media Partners purchased the station from WTXY Radio, LLC on August 1, 2019.

The station carries Whiteville High School Football and Baseball coverage in Columbus County.

On August 1, 2019, WTXY changed their format from soft adult contemporary to classic hits, branded as "Kool 103.9".

References

External links

TXY
Classic hits radio stations in the United States
Radio stations established in 1976
1976 establishments in North Carolina
TXY